Bartholomew Mosse (1712 – 16 February 1759) was an Irish surgeon and impresario responsible for founding the Rotunda Hospital in Dublin.

Early life
Bartholemew Mosse was born in Dysart, 2 km east of Portlaoise (then called Maryborough), the fifth son of seven children born to William Mosse, a Protestant clergyman, and Martha Boyle. 
Bartholomew apprenticed with Dr. John Stone as a barber-surgeon from 1729-1733, when he passed examination by the surgeon-general. 
He married Mary Elizabeth Mallory in 1734, and they had a son, Michael, who was born in 1737. 
While historical records are unclear, it appears that both mother and infant died shortly thereafter.

In 1738, he was appointed surgeon in charge of the draft of troops to Menorca, following which he spent time traveling through Europe. It is believed that it was during this time that he decided to focus on midwifery, to which end he observed maternity care in Paris, among other cities.

In 1742, he married his cousin, Jane Wittingham, with whom he had two children: Charles and Jane, born in 1745 and 1746 respectively.

The Dublin Lying-In Hospital

By 1743, he had determined to raise money for a purpose-built maternity hospital, which he achieved through subscriptions, as well as the patronage of many of Dublin's prominent citizens. With this money, he purchased an old theatre in George's Lane, which he converted into the Lying-In Hospital, opening in 1745.

Demand soon outstripped the capacity of the hospital, and Mosse staged theatrical productions to raise money for expansion. He also purchased land on the outskirts of the city, where he constructed a pleasure garden, concert hall and coffee house, known as the New Gardens. Profit from this venture was used to construct the Rotunda Hospital, designed by Richard Cassels, which opened on 8 December 1757.

Mosse spent a considerable amount of his personal fortune on this venture, falling into debt, and eventually being imprisoned for indebtedness, although he escaped through a window and went into hiding in Wales. He was also accused of misappropriation of funds, although no formal charges were ever brought, and Mosse was never convicted of any crime.

He died of unknown causes on 16 February 1759 and is interred in Donnybrook Cemetery. His successor at the Hospital was Fielding Ould.

Notes

References

1712 births
1759 deaths
18th-century Irish medical doctors
People from County Laois
Burials at Donnybrook Cemetery